The Sea, (Icelandic: Hafið), is a 2002 Icelandic film, directed by Baltasar Kormákur. The film tells the story of a wealthy Icelandic family, owners of a fish industry company in a small Icelandic coastal town, and various family issues they have to deal with.

Production
The Sea was filmed almost entirely in and around Neskaupstaður.

Cast
Gunnar Eyjólfsson as Thórdur
Hilmir Snær Guðnason as Ágúst
Hélène de Fougerolles as Françoise
Kristbjörg Kjeld as Kristín
Herdís Thorvaldsdóttir as Kata
Gudrún Gísladóttir as Ragnheidur
Sven Nordin as Morten
Elva Ósk Ólafsdóttir as Áslaug
Sigurdur Skúlason as Haraldur
Nína Dögg Filippusdóttir as María
Þröstur Leó Gunnarsson as Kalli bumba

Reception
On review aggregator website Rotten Tomatoes, the film holds a 50% approval rating, based on 52 reviews with an average rating of 5.7/10. On Metacritic, The Sea holds a 52 out of a 100 rank, which is based on 23 critics, indicating "mixed to average reviews".

Awards
The film won eight awards at the Edda Awards, Iceland in 2002 (Best Actor for Gunnar Eyjólfsson, Best Actress for Elva Ósk Ólafsdóttir, Best Director, Best Screenplay, Best Supporting Actor for Sigurður Skúlason, Best Supporting Actress for Herdís Þorvaldsdóttir, Film of the Year and Professional Category: Sound/Vision), where it was also nominated for 4 more awards. In the same year, it was nominated for the Nordic Council Film Prize and for the Golden Shell at the San Sebastián International Film Festival. In 2003, it won the FIPRESCI Prize at the Istanbul International Film Festival, where it was also nominated for the Golden Tulip, and the Audience Award at the Tromsø International Film Festival in Norway.

References

External links

Official Website

2002 films
2002 drama films
Films directed by Baltasar Kormákur
Icelandic drama films